Alice Williams Cling (Navajo, born March 21, 1946) is a Native American ceramist and potter known for creating beautiful and innovative pottery that has a distinctive rich reds, purples, browns and blacks that have a polished and shiny exteriors, revolutionizing the functional to works of art. Critics have argued that she is the most important Navajo potter of the last 25 years.

Early life 
Cling was born in Cow Springs, Arizona, in the Tonalea area of the Navajo Nation.

In 1966, Cling graduated from the Intermountain Indian School in Brigham City, Utah.

Career 
Cling learned the craft of pottery from her mother, Rose Williams, and her great aunt, Grace Barlow. The pots are created from clay found near the Black Mesa area in Apache-Navajo Counties in Arizona, and are then fired outdoors using juniper wood, with the firing process enhancing the clay's natural pigments. Cling and her mother and aunt were responsible for revitalizing traditional Navajo pottery.

Cling is a coil potter, and was the first Navajo potter to use a smooth river stone to polish her pots instead of the traditional corncob. Her pottery is considered non-utilitarian, which represented a huge shift from function to art.

In 1978, Cling's work was selected by Joan Mondale and featured in the vice-presidential mansion in Washington, D.C. and she was honored with the Arizona Indian Living Treasures Award in 2006. Cling's work is in the collection of the Smithsonian.

Personal life 
Cling learned her pottery skills from her mother, master potter Rose Williams. She lived across the highway from her mother in Shonto, Arizona. Following in the family tradition, Cling's daughters are also artists, as are her sisters, Sue Ann Williams, and Susie Williams Crank.

Cling married Jervis "Jerry" Cling shortly after graduating from high school. They had four children. She works and lives in the Shonto-Cow Springs area in Arizona.

Collections 
 Amerind Foundation, Dragoon, AZ
 Arizona State Museum, Tempe, AZ
 Heard Museum, Phoenix, AZ
 Millicent Rogers Museum, Taos, NM
 Phoenix Art Museum, Phoenix, AZ<
 Spencer Museum of Art, Lawrence, KS

Awards 
 2006: Arizona Indian Living Treasures Award

Selected works 
 , 1987
 , 1988

References

Further reading 
 
 
 
 
 
 
 
 
 
 
 
  – Published in conjunction with an exhibition held at the National Museum of Women in the Arts, Washington, D.C., Oct. 9, 1997-Jan. 11, 1998 and at the Heard Museum, Phoenix, Feb. 18-Apr. 18, 1998

External links 
 Alice Cling at Women Artists of the American West, Purdue University
 Alice Cling at Smithsonian American Art Museum

1946 births
Living people
Navajo artists
Native American potters
Native American women artists
People from Coconino County, Arizona
Women potters
American women ceramists
American ceramists
20th-century Native Americans
21st-century Native Americans
20th-century Native American women
21st-century Native American women